Livingston is a town in Columbia County, New York, United States. The population was 3,628 at the 2020 census. 

Livingston is in the southwestern part of Columbia County. U.S. Route 9 passes through the town.

History 

Prior to 1686, the area would have been part of the Dutch trading area of New Netherlands (Nieuw Nederland) along the Hudson River from Fort Nassau to New Amsterdam up to 1664 (after which it became British). The area of Columbia of which Livingston is in was settled after Fort Nassau was built in 1614.

The land grant for Livingston Manor was made in 1686 to Robert Livingston. The region was made a district in 1772, and the town of Livingston was founded in 1788, being one of the original towns of the county.

In 1710, the area was used to settle Palatine Germans.

The Burroughs–Foland Farm, Forth House, Linlithgo Reformed Church of Livingston, Henry W. Livingston House, Richmond Hill, and St. John's Evangelical Lutheran Church are listed on the National Register of Historic Places.

Geography

The western town line, in the center of the Hudson River, is the border of Greene County.

Demographics

2000
As of the census of 2000, there were 3,424 people, 1,332 households, and 889 families residing in the town.  The population density was 89.6 people per square mile (34.6/km2).  There were 1,651 housing units at an average density of 43.2 per square mile (16.7/km2).  The racial makeup of the town was 97.14% White, 1.46% African American, 0.12% Native American, 0.41% Asian, 0.03% Pacific Islander, 0.32% from other races, and 0.53% from two or more races. Hispanic or Latino of any race were 1.69% of the population.

There were 1,332 households, out of which 27.2% had children under the age of 18 living with them, 54.3% were married couples living together, 8.7% had a female householder with no husband present, and 33.2% were non-families. 26.8% of all households were made up of individuals, and 12.3% had someone living alone who was 65 years of age or older.  The average household size was 2.41 and the average family size was 2.95.

In the town, the population was spread out, with 21.5% under the age of 18, 6.0% from 18 to 24, 26.1% from 25 to 44, 25.3% from 45 to 64, and 21.1% who were 65 years of age or older.  The median age was 42 years. For every 100 females, there were 92.1 males.  For every 100 females age 18 and over, there were 91.0 males.

The median income for a household in the town was $37,117, and the median income for a family was $41,827. Males had a median income of $31,205 versus $23,750 for females. The per capita income for the town was $22,434.  About 4.2% of families and 5.9% of the population were below the poverty line, including 3.9% of those under age 18 and 5.2% of those age 65 or over.

Communities and locations in Livingston 
 Bells Pond – A small lake in the northeastern part of the town.
 Blue Stores – A hamlet in the southern section of the town; so named for a blue store that was located at the intersection of Routes 9 and 31.
 Burden – A hamlet west of Livingston village.
 Glencoe Mills – A hamlet in the northeastern part of the town, south of Linlithgo Mills.
 Linlithgo – A hamlet in the northwestern part of the town.  The Livingston Memorial Church and Burial Ground, Oak Hill, and Teviotdale are listed on the National Register of Historic Places.
 Linlithgo Mills – A hamlet in the northeastern corner of the town.
 Livingston – The hamlet of Livingston, with the town offices, is on County Route 19.

References

External links

 Town of Livingston official website
 First Lord of Livingston Manor
 Historical information about Livingston
 Livingston Free Library

New York (state) populated places on the Hudson River
Towns in Columbia County, New York
Palatine German settlement in New York (state)